Brevet may refer to:

Military
 Brevet (military), higher rank that rewards merit or gallantry, but without higher pay
 Brevet d'état-major, a military distinction in France and Belgium awarded to officers passing military staff college
 Aircrew brevet, or aircrew flying badge 
 Parachutist brevet, or parachutist badge
 Marine Corps Brevet Medal, a former military award in the U.S. Marines

Other uses
 Brevet (cycling), a long-distance cycling sport or a certificate awarded at such events
 Brevet college, a national diploma given to French pupils who pass the exam the end of 3e or year 10
 Brevet, a non-hereditary form of French nobility
 , a French term for a kind of patent
 "En France c'est le Brevet" famous quote by  Adrian IV on absolutism in the French Catholic Church